Frontside is an Australian electronic music group composed of Chris Arkley-Smith and Scott Simon. It was formed in 1995.

The Frontside single "Dammerung" / "Mind Distortion" was nominated for the 1998 ARIA Award for Best Dance Release. They released their self titled debut album in 1998.

Discography

Studio albums

Awards

ARIA Music Awards
The ARIA Music Awards is an annual awards ceremony that recognises excellence, innovation, and achievement across all genres of Australian music. They commenced in 1987. Frontside were nominated for one award.

|-
| 1998
| "Dammerung" / "Mind Distortion"
| ARIA Award for Best Dance Release
| 
|-

References

Australian electronic music groups